is a Japanese sports manga series written and illustrated by Gosho Aoyama. The story depicts the final tournament of high school baseball, at the Hanshin Koushien Stadium in Nishinomiya. The story's main characters are the high school baseball players Shigeo Nagashima and Kazuhisa Inao, whose names are taken from real-life Japanese baseball players Shigeo Nagashima and Kazuhisa Inao.

Originally serialized in Shogakukan's shōnen manga magazine Shōnen Sunday Zōkan between 1991 and 1993, the six chapters were compiled into a single tankōbon volume, published under Shōnen Sunday Comics imprint on March 18, 1993. A second edition was published under Shōnen Sunday Books imprint on December 10, 1999. A third edition, under Shogakukan Bunko imprint, was published on September 13, 2003.

Gosho Aoyama referenced this early work in his Detective Conan manga. In the Koshien Bomber Case, chapters 445–449, and the anime adaptation special "Miracle at Koshien Ball Park! The Defiants Face the Dark Demon".

Notes

References

1991 manga
Gosho Aoyama
Shogakukan manga
Shōnen manga